The Canadian Women's Hockey League (CWHL) was a women's ice hockey league. Established in 2007 as a Canadian women's senior league in the Greater Toronto Area, Montreal, and Ottawa, the league eventually expanded into Alberta, as well as teams in China and the United States throughout its tenure. The league discontinued operations May 1, 2019, after 12 seasons of operations. For most of its existence, it was the highest level women's hockey league in North America while registered as an amateur association. The National Women's Hockey League (now Premier Hockey Federation - and a different organization than the original NWHL [1998-2007]) was launched as a rival organization, while also paying its players, but with both leagues competing for the same talent. The CWHL began paying its players a stipend during its last two seasons before it folded.

History

Formation (2007–2010)
The CWHL was an initiative spearheaded by players such as Lisa-Marie Breton, Allyson Fox, Kathleen Kauth, Kim McCullough, Sami Jo Small and Jennifer Botterill, all of whom played in the original National Women's Hockey League, which was disbanded in 2007. The players worked with a group of volunteer business people to form the CWHL by following the example of the National Lacrosse League. The league would be responsible for all travel, ice rental and uniform costs, plus some equipment, but would not pay players.

In 2007, Hockey Canada announced it would revamp the Esso Women's Nationals, with the Western Women's Hockey League champion and finalist meeting the Canadian Women's Hockey League champion and finalist. Beginning in 2009, teams from the two leagues competed for the Clarkson Cup at the end of the season until the leagues effectively merged, under the CWHL banner, in 2011. The Clarkson Cup then became the playoff championship trophy for the CWHL.

The Brampton Canadettes Thunder won the first CWHL championship on 22 March 2008, winning 4–3 over the Mississauga Chiefs in the final.

In 2008–09, the Montreal Stars repeated as regular season champions, winning 25 of 30 games, and won CWHL Championship. The Stars would also go on to win the first Clarkson Cup over the Minnesota Whitecaps. The Stars would also take a third straight regular season championship the following season. The CWHL did not have an individual playoff champion in 2010 but instead had a Clarkson Cup qualifying playoff for the third team. The Stars and Mississauga Chiefs qualified for the Cup tournament from their regular season records and the Brampton Thunder qualified through the playoff. The Thunder then played into the Clarkson Cup final but lost to the Whitecaps.

Restructuring and stabilization (2010–2017)
Prior to the 2010–11 season, the league underwent a structural reorganization. The CWHL considered the restructure a relaunch of the league. Among the changes included the Mississauga Chiefs, Ottawa Senators and Vaughan Flames teams ceasing operations, adding a new team in Toronto, and expanding into the United States with a team in Boston. The relaunch also branded the five teams after their respective locations, simply calling them Boston CWHL, Brampton CWHL, Burlington CWHL, Montreal CWHL, and Toronto CWHL. However, the CWHL teams that were playing in previous markets were commonly referred to as their former names, the Boston team called itself the Boston Blades, and the new Toronto team was sometimes called Toronto HC. The league also held its first player draft, although it was only for the three Greater Toronto Area teams as the league decided that since they do not pay a salary, it would be unfair to force players to be based outside their hometown. All five teams returned to having monikers and Toronto was officially branded as the Toronto Furies.

The league announced on April 19, 2011, that it would merge with the Western Women's Hockey League for the 2011–12 season. The merger featured one team based in both Edmonton and Calgary as a combination of the former WWHL franchises the Edmonton Chimos and Strathmore Rockies. The team (called Team Alberta) played their games in various locations around Alberta. The WWHL then denied that there was in fact no merger and that the WWHL would continue for the 2011–12 season with two new teams joining the league. Strathmore and Edmonton were welcome to depart the WWHL but the league would not disband as initially reported by the CWHL through various media outlets. However, WWHL effectively ceased operations with only two members (the Whitecaps and Manitoba Maple Leafs) playing a series of exhibition games against various teams and the Clarkson Cup became a CWHL-only championship.

Changes continued in 2012 with the Burlington Barracudas folding and Team Alberta taking on the nickname "Honeybadgers". The league also created a draft system whereby players in Boston, Alberta, and Montreal could choose which team they would play on, but players in the Toronto area could be forced to play for one of the two remaining Greater Toronto Area (GTA) teams, Brampton or Toronto. Further, a player's pre-draft declaration of the regional area in which they wished to play could be altered after the draft. As a result of these rules, players wishing to leave GTA teams to play in Boston, Alberta, or Montreal could do so as desired, without compensation to the GTA team that they left. Players who wished to leave one GTA team to go to the other GTA team could only be moved upon a trade between the teams.

On November 13, 2012, in a reversal from its previous position that sponsorships could not be directed to a particular team, the CWHL announced that the Toronto Furies would be partnering with the Toronto Maple Leafs of the National Hockey League in a multi-year deal by which the Maple Leafs would provide funding for coaches, equipment and travel expenses. The CWHL announced a similar partnership between the Alberta Honeybadgers team and the Calgary Flames, the Honeybadgers would then rebrand as the Calgary Inferno the following season. The Montreal Stars would follow the trend in 2015 with a partnership with the Montreal Canadiens by becoming Les Canadiennes.

The league held its 1st Canadian Women's Hockey League All-Star Game on December 13, 2014, at Toronto's Air Canada Centre.

China, player stipends, and league demise (2017–2019)
It was announced on June 5, 2017, that the CWHL was expanding to China with Kunlun Red Star WIH, a team controlled by Kunlun Red Star of the Kontinental Hockey League, and the Vanke Rays. Each team was set to play six games against its five rivals for a total of 30 games, 15 at home and 15 on the road. In order to minimize travel, each North America-based team made one road trip to China to play a three-game series. Kunlun Red Star's road games were likewise be grouped into five three-game series. The announced reason for the China expansion is for the nation to develop its hockey teams in preparation for its recently awarded 2022 Winter Olympics to be held in Beijing.

Along with its expansion into China for the 2017–18 season, the league announced it would also begin paying its players for the first time. The finances for the player's salaries came from the increased revenue from its Chinese partnership. Player stipends were set to a minimum of $2,000 per season and a maximum of $10,000 with a team salary cap of $100,000, although it was still registered as an amateur league with the Canada Revenue Agency. At the time of the announcement, it made the league the second women's hockey league in North America to pay players after the launch of the rival National Women's Hockey League (NWHL) in the United States in 2015.

In 2018, CWHL player Jessica Platt came out as a transgender woman, making her the first transgender woman to come out in North American professional hockey, and second transgender professional player after Harrison Browne came out as a transgender man in the NWHL in 2016.

On July 19, 2018, inaugural league commissioner Brenda Andress announced she would be stepping down and Jayna Hefford was named the interim commissioner. The league also consolidated their Chinese teams by ending the membership of the Vanke Rays and rebranding Kunlun Red Star as Shenzhen KRS Vanke Rays.

On March 31, 2019, it was announced that the CWHL board of directors had decided that the league would discontinue operations effective May 1, 2019. The league cited that the fragmentation of corporate sponsors between the two women's hockey leagues led to the league becoming financially infeasible, but that the Chinese partnership had kept the league operating during the previous seasons. The board of directors believed it owed its players more than the league could continue to provide, that there is only room from one women's league, and encouraged the players to push any successor leagues to pay a livable wage.

The staff of the Toronto Furies and Les Canadiennes announced that their organizations intended to continue operations while the Calgary Inferno stated they would continue to support women's hockey in Alberta. During the season, NWHL commissioner Dani Rylan had been in talks with the CWHL about the possibility of a single league. On April 2, 2019, the NWHL announced the plans to add two expansion franchises in Montreal and Toronto and based on financial support from the National Hockey League and investors in Montreal and Toronto, including people involved with Les Canadiennes de Montreal and the Toronto Furies. Ultimately, the NWHL had its own set of difficulties in the 2019 offseason, including a player boycott following the closing of the CWHL, and did not add Montreal and Toronto for the 2019–20 season. The Shenzhen KRS Vanke Rays was the only former CWHL to participate in the 2019–20 season by joining the Russian Women's Hockey League. In 2020, the NWHL announced an expansion to Toronto for the 2020–21 season in the form of the Toronto Six.

Television coverage
Specialty television channel Sportsnet aired the playoffs and the All-Star Game from 2014–15 until 2018–19. The most watched game was the February 4, 2017 game between Montreal and Toronto, which averaged 136,400 viewers. This record was surpassed on 24 March 2019, when the 2019 Clarkson Cup Final aired on Sportsnet and over 170,000 people tuned in.

Teams

Championships

Drafts
The first league draft was held on August 12, 2010, at the Hockey Hall of Fame in Toronto. In the 2010 CWHL Draft, Olympic gold medallist Tessa Bonhomme was the first overall selection.

First overall picks

All-time leaderboard

All-time leading scorers (2007–08 to 2018–19)
The annual CWHL scoring champion wins the Angela James Bowl. In 2011–12, rookie Meghan Agosta set a CWHL single-season record with 80 points.

All-time leaders in shutouts (2007–08 to 2014–15)

Most shutouts during the CWHL regular season. Kim St-Pierre (2008–09) and Sami Jo Small (2009–10) hold the single-season record with five shutouts.

NCAA exhibition

 On November 2, 2011, Scanzano was on loan from the Toronto Furies, as she appeared in one game for the Brampton Thunder. The game was an exhibition contest versus her alma mater, the Mercyhurst Lakers. In the second period of said contest, Scanzano scored the game-winning goal as the Thunder defeated the Lakers by a 3–1 tally.

References

External links

News stories
 Canadian Women's Hockey League launches CBCsports, September 27, 2007
 Rob Duffy, The case for a women's professional hockey league  in Eyeweekly.com, February 22, 2010.
 Neate Sager, Women's hockey league eyes partnering with NHL February 26, 2010.
 Meg Hewings, Women's pro league could help grow hockey in Hour.ca, September 16, 2010.
 Stephanie Myles, Women's hockey in need of more promotion, sponsors  in Calgary Herald, March 23, 2011.

 
1
2
2007 establishments in Canada
Sports leagues established in 2007
2019 disestablishments in Canada
Sports leagues disestablished in 2019
Professional sports leagues in Canada
Multi-national professional sports leagues